Rhagovelia cardia is a species of aquatic bug first found in Altaquer, Río Ñambí, Nariño, Colombia.

References

Further reading
 Tatiana, Parra-Trujillo Yessica, Dora Nancy Padilla Gil, and Gladys Reinoso-Flórez. "DIVERSIDAD Y DISTRIBUCIÓN DE Rhagovelia (HEMIPTERA, VELIIDAE) DEL DEPARTAMENTO DEL TOLIMA." Magazine of the Colombian Association of Biological Sciences (ACCB) 26 (2014).
 Gil, Dora Nancy Padilla. "LAS CHINCHES SEMI-ACUÁTICAS DE LA RESERVA NATURAL RÍO ÑAMBÍ (NARIÑO), COLOMBIA The Semi-Aquatic Bugs from the Ñambi River Natural Reserve (Nariño), Colombia." (2015).

Veliidae
Endemic fauna of Colombia
Insects described in 2011